Gerhard Reinhardt (May 4, 1916 – August 22, 1989) was an East German politician and German Resistance fighter against Nazism.

Life and work 
Reinhardt was born in Werdau, in the Kingdom of Saxony, a state of the German Empire. He was born into a family of textile workers and himself learned how to be a locksmith, finishing his training with journeyman years spent traveling through several countries in Europe, including France, Switzerland and Austria. In 1930, he joined the Young Communist League of Germany.

After the Nazis seized power in 1933, Reinhardt became active in the German Resistance. He was arrested and in 1936, sentenced to a prison term in the Zuchthaus in Waldheim, Saxony. He worked as a machinist in Werdau between 1939 and 1942, when he was forced to fight in the 999th Light Afrika Division, a penal battalion. In 1943, he deserted and went to fight with the Greek partisans as part of the Anti-Fascist Committee for a Free Germany in Greece, which he co-founded with Falk Harnack. Later, he became its representative for the XIII Greek People's Liberation Army (ELAS) Division. He became a captain in ELAS before going to Yugoslavia, where he became an officer in the Second Austrian Freedom Battalion in the Third Yugoslavian Army.

He returned to Germany in summer 1945 and in 1946, became a member of the Socialist Unity Party. He went to work in the Land and Forest Ministry, part of the Ministry of the Interior. In 1961, he became the Secretary of the Central Committee for Jugendweihe; later, he became the Secretary of the central leadership of the Committees of the Anti-Fascist Resistance Fighters.

References

Sources 
Strafdivision 999: Erlebnisse und Berichte aus dem antifaschistischen Widerstandskampf. Deutscher Militärverlag, Berlin (1965), p. 332 
Andreas Herbst et al. (Ed.): So funktionierte die DDR. Volume 3: Lexikon der Funktionäre. Rowohlt, Reinbek (1994), p. 271 
Gerd-Rüdiger Stephan et al. (Ed.): Die Parteien und Organisationen der DDR. Ein Handbuch. Dietz, Berlin (2002), p. 1060 

1916 births
1989 deaths
People from Werdau
People from the Kingdom of Saxony
Socialist Unity Party of Germany politicians
German resistance members
Greek Resistance members
German Army soldiers of World War II